"Uist" is a group of six islands and are part of the Outer Hebridean Archipelago, part of the Outer Hebrides of Scotland.

North Uist and South Uist ( or) are two of the islands and are linked by causeways running via the isles of Benbecula and Grimsay.

The islands, collectively, have a population of 4,723.

Major settlements

The main settlements in Uist are:

South Uist
  (Daliburgh)
  (Lochboisdale)
  (Snishvale)
  (Stoneybridge)
  (Eochar)
  (Polochar)
  (Eriskay)

Benbecula
  (Balivanich)
  (Creagorry)
   (Liniclate)

North Uist
  (Carinish)
  (Bayhead)
  (Sollas)
  (Lochmaddy)
  (Balemore)

16th century

Geography
Writing in 1549, Sir Donald Monro, High Dean of the Isles stated of "Ywst" that it was a fertile country full of high hills and forests on the east coast with five parish kirks. He also noted that in the north of "Ywst ther is sundrie covis and holes in the earth, coverit with heddir above, quhilk fosters maney rebellis in the countrey".

Fishing
Monro stated that "the sea has gotten enteries to this fresche water loche" and described the "thicke dyke of rough staines" that had been created to prevent salt water ingress. This apparently resulted in numerous fish being caught in the stones, including "fluikes, podloches, skatts, and herings" and he described another "kynd of fishe, the quhantitie and shape of ane salmont, but it has na skaills at all; the under haffe, narrest his vombe is quhite, and the upmaist haffe narrest his back is als black as jett".

Land tenure
Monro's description was:
This countrey is bruiked by sundrey captains; to witt, the south southwest end of it, callit Bayhastill, be M’Neill of Barray, the rest of the ile, namit Peiter’s parochin, the parochin of Howes, and the mayne land of the mid countrey callit Mackermeanache, perteins to Clanronald, halding of the Clandonald. At the end heirof the sea enters, and cuts the countrey be ebbing and flowing through it: and in the north syde of this there is ane parochin callit Buchagla, perteining to the said Clandonald. At the north end thereof the sea cuts the countrey againe, and that cutting of the sea is called Careynesse, and benorth this countrey is called Kenehnache of Ywst, that is in Englishe, the north head of Ywst, whilk term is twa paroche kirks, and is mair of profit than the rest of haill of Ywst, perteining to Donald Gormesone.

See also

Bonnie Prince Charlie
Benbecula was the island from which Flora MacDonald aided the escape of Prince Charles Edward Stuart (Bonnie Prince Charlie) to Kilbride, Skye in June 1746, following his defeat at the Battle of Culloden.

Notes

References

See also
 List of Outer Hebrides
 
 Force-fire

External links
 Panoramas of Uist (QuickTime required)
 Archaeology of Uist - kite aerial photography
 Local Site Dedicated to Uist